Wacousta Township is one of twelve townships in Humboldt County, Iowa, USA. As of the 2000 census, its population was 246.

History
Wacousta Township was organized in 1858.

Geography

Cities, towns, villages
Ottosen

Adjacent townships
 Garfield Township, Kossuth County (north)
 Riverdale Township, Kossuth County (northeast)
 Delana Township (east)
 Rutland Township (southeast)
 Avery Township (south)
 Garfield Township, Pocahontas County (southwest)
 Des Moines Township, Pocahontas County (west)
 West Bend Township, Palo Alto County (northwest)

Political districts
 Iowa's 4th congressional district
 State House District 4

Cemeteries
Wacousta Township contains McKnight Cemetery and Union Cemetery, in addition to the Omer-Thorsen Farm.

References
 United States Census Bureau 2008 TIGER/Line Shapefiles
 United States Board on Geographic Names (GNIS)
 United States National Atlas

External links
 US-Counties.com
 City-Data.com

Townships in Humboldt County, Iowa
Townships in Iowa